James Frank Lord (November 26, 1948 – June 6, 2008) was an American lawyer and politician who served as the Minnesota state treasurer from 1975 to 1983.

Early life and education 
Born in Chanhassen, Minnesota, Lord was the son of United States District Court Judge Miles Lord. He earned a Bachelor of Arts degree from the University of Minnesota and a Juris Doctor from the William Mitchell College of Law.

Career 
Lord began his career as an aide in the United States Senate for Hubert Humphrey and Walter Mondale. He also served in the United States Merchant Marine. In the 1970s, he served as a liaison between Governor Wendell R. Anderson's office other government agencies. Lord was elected to the Minnesota Senate in 1972 at the age of 23 and served from 1973 to 1975. He served as Minnesota state treasurer from 1975 to 1983.

Personal life 
Lord died from a heart attack in 2008.

References

1948 births
2008 deaths
People from Chanhassen, Minnesota
People from Excelsior, Minnesota
United States Merchant Mariners
University of Minnesota alumni
William Mitchell College of Law alumni
Minnesota lawyers
Democratic Party Minnesota state senators
State treasurers of Minnesota
20th-century American politicians
20th-century American lawyers